Wallace Reginald McDonald (18 July 1876 – 2 May 1946) was a Liberal party member of the House of Commons of Canada. He was born in Portage-du-Fort, Quebec and became a merchant by career.

McDonald attended the University of Ottawa. He became mayor of Chapeau, Quebec from 1915 to 1923 and served as warden of Pontiac County from 1918 to 1921.

He was elected to the Legislative Assembly of Quebec for the Quebec Liberal Party in 1919 for the Pontiac electoral district then re-elected for successive terms in 1923, 1927, and 1931.

McDonald resigned his provincial seat on 25 September 1935 to seek national office for the federal Liberal party. He was elected to the House of Commons at the Pontiac riding in the 1935 general election then re-elected in 1940 and 1945.

After a year of ill health, McDonald died at his home in Chapeau on 2 May 1946 before completing his term in the 20th Canadian Parliament.

Electoral record

References

External links
 
 

1876 births
1946 deaths
Canadian merchants
Liberal Party of Canada MPs
Members of the House of Commons of Canada from Quebec
Quebec Liberal Party MNAs
University of Ottawa alumni